Amjad Saddiq (born 12 December 1959) is a Pakistani former first-class cricketer who played for Water and Power Development Authority cricket team between 1981 and 1988, including some time as captain.
 
He started his career as an all-rounder and in 1986/1987 WAPDA placed 3rd position in Quaid e Azam trophy under his captaincy. In 1992 Saddiq was appointed as a head coach of WAPDA cricket team in Domestic circuit.

Coaching career
After retiring from first-class cricket last in 1992, Saddiq became the head coach of the Water and Power Development Authority cricket team side due to his service as captain. Saddiq is a qualified Pakistan Cricket Board Level 1 and 2 coach. WAPDA won 1 Quaid-e-Azam Trophy and 2 National one day title and 5 times runner-up under his coaching in Pakistan domestic events.

In December 2019, Amjad Saddiq has been retired from Pakistan WAPDA cricket Assistant manager and Head Coaching role due to Pakistan's Prime Minister Imran Khan revamped the domestic cricket structure in Pakistan, excluding departmental teams in favour of regional sides, therefore ending the participation of the team.[4] The Pakistan Cricket Board (PCB) was criticised in removing departmental sides, with players voicing their concern to revive the teams.[5]

Achievements as coach
Quaid-e-Azam Trophy 
 2002/03 (quarter-final)
 2016/17 (winner)
2017/18  (Runner Up)

Patron's Trophy

 2006/07 (Quadrangular Stage)

National One-day Championship
 1997/98 (final round)
 1998/99 (final round)
 1999/2000 (semi-final)
 2001/02 (semi-final)
 2002/03  (runner-up)
 2004/05  (winner)
 2005/06 (semi-final)
 2007/08 (Super Eight)
 2010/11 (semi-final)
 2014/15 (winner)
 2016/17(runner-up)
 2017/18(runner-up)
 2018/19(runner-up)

References

External links
 
Amjad Siddique Maidan first class century
Points Table 1986/1987 Quaid e Azam Trophy https://www.pcb.com.pk/quaideazam-trophy-198687/points-table/268.html

1959 births
Living people
Water and Power Development Authority cricketers
Pakistani cricket coaches
Cricketers from Lahore
Pakistani cricketers